Marie-Thérèse-Charlotte was the eldest child of King Louis XVI of France.

Marie-Thérèse-Charlotte may also refer to:

Lady Marie Therese Charlotte Bruce, wife of Maximilian, Prince of Hornes
Marie-Thérèse Charlotte de Lamourous

See also
Marie-Thérèse (disambiguation)